The Independent Eye is an American theatre company currently based in Sebastopol, California.

The group was founded in 1974 by Conrad Bishop and Elizabeth Fuller, who were then performing with Theatre X in Milwaukee and had helped to found that group. Bishop and Fuller moved to Chicago and began writing and producing their own work, performing sometimes as a duo and sometimes with a small core of collaborators. The group was later established as a regional theatre in Lancaster, Pennsylvania and Philadelphia, before moving to Sebastopol in 1999. It has toured throughout the United States and Europe, and has created numerous works for radio. Its current public radio series Hitchhiking off the Map has won a Silver Reel Award from the National Federation of Community Broadcasters.

External links
 Official website

Theatre companies in California
1974 establishments in California
Sebastopol, California
Organizations based in Sonoma County, California